Iszlam Monier Suliman (born 17 December 1990) is a Hungarian Sudanese judoka, born in Miskolc.

Career
He competed at the 2016 Summer Olympics in Rio de Janeiro, in the men's 90 kg where he was defeated by Colton Brown in the second round.

References

External links

1990 births
Living people
Hungarian male judoka
Sudanese male judoka
Olympic judoka of Sudan
Judoka at the 2016 Summer Olympics
Sportspeople from Miskolc
21st-century Hungarian people
21st-century Sudanese people